Kosmopoliet I (800 tons) is said to have been one of the first Dutch clippers.

Kosmopoliet I
She was launched on 29 November, 1854 by the shipyard of Cornelis Gips and Sons in Dordrecht, The Netherlands, for the account of the shipping company of Gebr. Blussé (Dordrecht), inspired by a model of a medium-clipper presented in 1852 at an exhibition in Amsterdam by the Dutch lieutenant-commander M.H. Jansen. 

The Kosmopoliet carried both cargo and passengers. She was full-rigged and carried royals and skysails on all three masts. 

Though a voyage from the Netherlands to Java (port to port) normally took a 100 days or more, the Kosmopoliet completed her maiden voyage in 89 days. Later she did the passage in 76, 74 and 77 days.

Kosmopoliet II and Kosmopoliet III

In 1865 the Kosmopoliet II (1200 tons) was launched, followed by Kosmopoliet III in 1871, which measured 1548 tons.

External links
SCHEEPSWERF VAN GIPS ,,DE MERWEDE,, ANNO 1796 TE DORDRECHT

Clippers
Sailing ships of the Netherlands
Merchant ships of the Netherlands
Passenger ships of the Netherlands
Ships built in the Netherlands
1854 ships